Verkhny Kiev is a rural locality (a khutor) in Aleynikovskoye Rural Settlement, Rossoshansky District, Voronezh Oblast, Russia. The population was 53 as of 2010. There are 2 streets.

Geography 
Verkhny Kiev is located 18 km northeast of Rossosh (the district's administrative centre) by road. Vodyanoye is the nearest rural locality.

References 

Rural localities in Rossoshansky District